Djabe is a Hungarian jazz-rock band formed in 1996.

History 
The name Djabe is influenced by the Akan word djabe, which means freedom. The group composes its own works in which jazz style is mixed with elements of Hungarian and African music. The band has performed internationally at several festivals. Moreover, they worked with guitarist Steve Hackett and Ben Castle.

Awards
 2001: eMeRTon Award for Update (2001)

Discography 
 1996: Djabe
 1998: Witchi Tai To
 1999: Ly-O-Lay Ale Loya
 1999: Lay-a-Loya 
 2000: Tour 2000
 2001: Update
 2003: Táncolnak a Kazlak
 2003: Unplugged at the New Orleans=
 2004: Gödöllô, 2001. Június 23.
 2005: Slices of Life/Életképek
 2007: Message from the Road
 2007: Köszönjük Sipi!
 2008: Take On
 2009: Sipi Emlékkoncert – Sipi Benefit Concert (with Steve Hackett)
 2011: In the Footsteps of Attila and Genghis (with Steve Hackett)
 2011: Djabe 15 – 15th Anniversary Concert
 2012: Down and Up
 2013: Summer Storms & Rocking Rivers (with Steve Hackett)
 2014: Forward
 2014: Live in Blue (with Steve Hackett, Gulli Briem, John Nugent)
 2016: 20 Dimensions
 2017: Life Is a Journey (The Sardinia Tapes) (with Steve Hackett)
 2018: It Is Never the Same Twice (with Steve Hackett and And Gulli Briem)
 2020: The Magic Stag (with Steve Hackett)
 2021: The Journey Continues (with Steve Hackett)
 2022: Before

Videos  
 2002: Flying – Live in Concert
 2006: Táncoltak a Kazlak/Sheafs Were Dancing
 2011: 15th Anniversary Concert
 2012: Slices of Live

Personnel
 Ferenc Kovács – trumpet, violin, vocals
 Attila Égerházi – guitar, percussion
 Zoltán Kovács – piano, keyboards
 Tamás Barabás – bass guitar
 Szilárd Banai – drums

References

External links
 Official website
 Djabe's Biography & Discography at ProgArchives.com
 Djabe's Discography at Discogs.com

Hungarian jazz ensembles
Hungarian world music groups